The Second Battle of Fallujah, codenamed Operation al-Fajr and Operation Phantom Fury, was an American-led offensive of the Iraq War that lasted roughly six weeks, starting 7 November 2004. Marking the highest point of the conflict against the Iraqi insurgency, it was a joint military effort carried out by the United States, the Iraqi Interim Government, and the United Kingdom. Within the city of Fallujah, the coalition was led by the U.S. Marine Corps and U.S. Army, the battle was later described as "some of the heaviest urban combat U.S. military have been involved in since the Battle of Huế City in Vietnam in 1968".

Operation Phantom Fury was the second major coalition effort in Fallujah. Earlier, in April 2004, coalition forces fought the First Battle of Fallujah in an attempt to capture or kill insurgent elements who were considered responsible for the 2004 Fallujah ambush, which resulted in the deaths of four private military contractors of Blackwater. When the coalition fought their way into the centre of the city, the Iraqi Interim Government requested that the city's control be transferred over to an Iraqi-run local security force, which then began stockpiling weapons and building complex defenses across the city through mid-2004. The Second Battle of Fallujah was the bloodiest battle of the entire conflict for American troops, and is notable for being the first major engagement of the Iraq War that was fought solely against insurgents as opposed to the government military forces of the former Ba'athist Iraq.

Background
In February 2004, control of Fallujah and the surrounding area in the Al Anbar Governorate was transferred from the U.S. 82nd Airborne Division to the 1st Marine Division. Shortly afterward, on 31 March 2004, four American private military contractors from Blackwater – Wesley Batalona, Scott Helvenston, Jerry Zovko, and Michael Teague – were ambushed and killed in the city. Images of their mutilated bodies were broadcast around the world. Journalist Jeremy Scahill later called this incident the Mogadishu moment of the Iraq War (referencing the Battle of Mogadishu, also known as the "Black Hawk Down" incident). Although tactical commanders in Iraq considered these deaths militarily insignificant, U.S. political leaders disapproved of a measured approach targeting the perpetrators and instead requested a larger assault into the city. A leak later revealed that the main factor behind this wasn't the killings themselves, but the circulation of images of the event which served as a symbol of opposition to American forces in Iraq.

Within days, U.S. Marine Corps forces launched Operation Vigilant Resolve (5 April 2004) to take back control of the city from insurgent forces. On 28 April 2004, Operation Vigilant Resolve ended with an agreement where the local population was ordered to keep the insurgents out of the city. The Fallujah Brigade, composed of local Iraqis under the command of a former Ba'athist officer named Muhammed Latif, took control of the city.

Insurgent strength and control began to grow to such an extent that by 24 September 2004, a senior U.S. official told ABC News that catching Abu Musab al-Zarqawi, said to be in Fallujah, was now "the highest priority," and estimated his troops at 5,000 men, mostly non-Iraqis. However, the stated purpose of the military operation in Fallujah was to weaken the insurgency in preparation for the planned Iraqi elections in January 2005.

Preparations

Coalition forces
Before beginning their attack, U.S. and Iraqi forces had established checkpoints around the city to prevent anyone from entering, and to intercept insurgents attempting to flee. In addition, overhead imagery was used to prepare maps of the city for use by the attackers. American units were augmented by Iraqi interpreters to assist them in the planned fight. After weeks of withstanding air strikes and artillery bombardment, the militants in the city appeared to be vulnerable to direct attack.

U.S., Iraqi and British forces totaled about 13,500. The U.S. had gathered some 6,500 Marines and 1,500 Army soldiers that would take part in the assault with about 2,500 Navy personnel in operational and support roles. U.S. troops were grouped in two Regimental Combat Teams: Regimental Combat Team 1 comprised 3rd Battalion/1st Marines, 3rd Battalion/5th Marines, and U.S. Army 2d Battalion/7th Cavalry. Regimental Combat Team 7 comprised the 1st Battalion/8th Marines, 1st Battalion/3rd Marines, U.S. Army 2d Battalion/2d Infantry, 2d Battalion/12th Cavalry About 2,000 Iraqi troops assisted with the assault. All were supported by Marine fixed and rotary-winged aircraft, Navy and Air Force fixed-wing aircraft; and USSOCOM Sniper Elements.

The 850-strong 1st Battalion of the Black Watch was ordered to help U.S. and Iraqi forces with the encirclement of Fallujah. As part of Task Force Black, D Squadron of the British SAS prepared to take part in the operation, but British political nervousness about the possible scale of casualties stopped any direct UK involvement in the ground battle.

Insurgent forces
In April, Fallujah was defended by about 500 "hardcore" and 1,000+ "part time" insurgents. By November, it was estimated that the numbers had doubled. Another estimate put the number of insurgents at 3,000; however, a number of insurgent leaders escaped before the attack.

Fallujah was occupied by virtually every insurgent group in Iraq: al-Qaeda in Iraq (AQI), Islamic Army of Iraq (IAI), Ansar al-Sunna, Army of Mohammed (AOM), the Army of the Mujahedeen and the Secret Islamic Army of Iraq. Three groups, (AQI, IAI and the National Islamic Army (1920 Revolution Brigade)) had their nationwide headquarters in Fallujah. An estimated 2,000 insurgents were from the Army of Mohammed (made up of ex Fedayeen Saddam fighters), Ansar al-Sunna and various smaller Iraqi groups.

Unlike what most cities in Iraq saw, the Battle of Fallujah did not have internal disputes between insurgents, The fighters consisted of both Sunnis and Shi'as, Soldiers of the Mahdi army fought alongside Sunni and Ba'athist groups against the United States.
The Iraqi insurgents and foreign Mujahideen present in the city prepared fortified defenses in advance of the anticipated attack. They dug tunnels, trenches, prepared spider holes, and built and hid a wide variety of IEDs. In some locations they filled the interiors of darkened homes with large numbers of propane bottles, large drums of gasoline, and ordnance, all wired to a remote trigger that could be set off by an insurgent when troops entered the building. They blocked streets with Jersey barriers and even emplaced them within homes to create strong points behind which they could attack unsuspecting troops entering the building. Insurgents were equipped with a variety of advanced small arms, and had captured a variety of U.S. armament, including M14s, M16s, body armor, uniforms and helmets.

They booby-trapped buildings and vehicles, including wiring doors and windows to grenades and other ordnance. Anticipating U.S. tactics to seize the roof of high buildings, they bricked up stairwells to the roofs of many buildings, creating paths into prepared fields of fire which they hoped the troops would enter.

Intelligence briefings given prior to battle reported that coalition forces would encounter Chechen, Filipino, Saudi, Libyan, and Syrian combatants, as well as native Iraqis.

Civilian presence
Most of Fallujah's civilian population fled the city before the battle, which greatly reduced the potential for noncombatant casualties. U.S. military officials estimated that 70–90% of the 300,000 civilians in the city fled before the attack, leaving 30,000 to 90,000 civilians still in the city. The military used leaflets and broadcasts to encourage civilians to leave the city before the assault. However, multiple news agencies reported that military-aged males were prevented from leaving or entering the city by the U.S. military. Additionally, not all civilians had the means to leave Fallujah before the battle. Jane Arraf, who was embedded with U.S. troops said that some families wrote "We are family" on the doors of their homes, hoping the Marines would not attack during the battle.

The battle

Diversion

With Navy SEAL and Marine Recon Snipers providing reconnaissance and target marking on the city perimeter, ground operations began on the night of 7 November 2004. Attacking from the west and south, the Iraqi 36th Commando Battalion with their U.S. Army Special Forces advisers, SEAL Sniper Task Elements from Naval Special Warfare Task Group Central and the U.S. Marine Corps Scout Platoon, 1st and 2nd Platoon Charlie Company, Manchu 1st Battalion 9th Infantry Regiment Mechanized, 2nd Brigade Combat Team, 2nd Infantry Division (U.S. Army) served as the main effort on the peninsula and supported by 3rd Platoon Alpha Company 2/72nd Tank Battalion (U.S. Army), and 3rd Light Armored Reconnaissance Battalion, reinforced by Bravo Company from the Marine Corps Reserve's 1st Battalion, 23rd Regiment, and supported by Combat Service Support Company 122, from Combat Service Support Battalion 1, captured Fallujah General Hospital, Blackwater Bridge, ING building, and villages opposite of the Euphrates River along Fallujah's western edge. Marines from 1/3 fired 81mm mortars in an operation in south Fallujah. The same unit then moved to the western approaches to the city and secured the Jurf Kas Sukr Bridge. These initial attacks, however, were a diversion intended to distract and confuse insurgents holding the city, preceding the all-out offensive. Two Marines died in the initial attacks when their bulldozer fell into the Euphrates River. 42 insurgents were killed along the Fallujah riverside.

Attack

After Navy Seabees from I MEF Engineer Group (MEG) interrupted and disabled electrical power at two substations located just northeast and northwest of the city, two Marine Regimental Combat Teams, Regimental Combat Team 1 (RCT-1) and Regimental Combat Team 7 (RCT-7) launched an attack along the northern edge of the city. They were joined by two U.S. Army heavy battalion mechanized units, the 2nd Battalion, 7th Cavalry Regiment, and Task Force 2nd Battalion, 2nd Infantry Regiment (Mechanized), followed by four Marine infantry battalions tasked with clearing buildings. The Army's mechanized Second Brigade, First Cavalry Division, Marines' Second Reconnaissance Battalion and A. Co 1st Battalion, 5th Infantry Regiment, was tasked with infiltrating the city and destroying any fleeing enemy forces. The British Army's 1st Battalion, The Black Watch, patrolled the main highways to the east. The RCTs were augmented by three 7-man SEAL Sniper Teams from Naval Special Warfare Task Group-Central and one platoon from 1st Recon, who provided advance reconnaissance in the city, Joint Terminal Aircraft Control (JTAC) and unilateral overwatch throughout the operation. The United States Air Force provided close air support for the ground offensive, employing F-15 Strike Eagles, F-16 Fighting Falcons, A-10 Thunderbolt IIs, B-52 Stratofortresses, and AC-130 gunships to carry out close-quarter precision airstrikes against enemy strongholds within the city. The Air Force also employed MQ-1 Predator unmanned aerial vehicles for reconnaissance and precision strikes, and the U-2 Dragon Lady high-altitude reconnaissance aircraft for intelligence collection, surveillance and reconnaissance before, during, and after the battle.

The six battalions of U.S. and Iraqi forces, aided by Marine Corps Scout and Target Acquisition, SEAL Sniper, and JTAC elements pre-fire operations, moved into the city under the cover of darkness; and once aligned with the reconnaissance elements, began the assault in the early hours of 8 November 2004, preceded by an intense artillery barrage firing some 2500 155mm projectiles and air attack. This was followed by an attack on the main train station, which was then used as a staging point for follow-on forces. By that afternoon, under the protection of intense air cover, Marines entered the Hay Naib al-Dubat and al-Naziza districts. The Marines were followed by the Navy Seabees of NMCB 4 and NMCB 23 who bulldozed the streets clear of debris from the bombardment that morning. The Seabees used armored bulldozers to plow the streets while remaining safe and protected from enemy fire. Shortly after nightfall on 9 November 2004, Marines had reportedly reached Phase Line Fran at Highway 10 in the center of the city.

While most of the fighting subsided by 13 November 2004, U.S. Marines and Special Operations Forces continued to face determined isolated resistance from insurgents hidden throughout the city. By 16 November 2004, after nine days of fighting, the Marine command described the action as mopping up pockets of resistance. Sporadic fighting continued until 23 December 2004.

By late January 2005, news reports indicated U.S. combat units were leaving the area, and were assisting the local population in returning to the now heavily damaged city.

Recognition

Staff Sergeant David Bellavia of the Army Task Force 2-2 Infantry was awarded the Medal of Honor.

Nine Marines were awarded the Navy Cross: 
Sergeant Rafael Peralta of 1st Battalion, 3rd Marines
First Sergeant Bradley Kasal of 3rd Battalion, 1st Marines
Sergeant Robert Mitchell, Jr. of 3rd Battalion, 1st Marines
Corporal Jeremiah Workman of 3rd Battalion, 5th Marines
Lance Corporal Christopher S. Adlesperger of 3rd Battalion, 5th Marines
Corporal Jason S. Clairday of 3rd Battalion, 5th Marines
Sergeant Jarrett Kraft of 3rd Battalion, 5th Marines
Staff Sergeant Aubrey McDade of 1st Battalion, 8th Marines
Corporal Dominic Esquibel of 1st Battalion, 8th Marines

Corporal Esquibel refused the award, citing "personal reasons".

The following were awarded the Presidential Unit Citation for actions during the battle:
U.S. Army Task Force 2nd Battalion, 2nd Infantry Regiment, 1st Infantry Division
U.S. Army Task Force 2nd Battalion, 7th Cavalry Regiment, 1st Cavalry Division
Naval Special Warfare Task Group-Central

Aftermath

The battle proved to be the bloodiest of the war and the bloodiest battle involving American troops since the Vietnam War. Comparisons with the Battle of Hue City and the Pacific campaign of World War II were made. Coalition forces suffered a total of 107 killed and 613 wounded during Operation Phantom Fury. U.S. forces had 54 killed and 425 wounded in the initial attack in November. By 23 December when the operation was officially concluded, the casualty number had risen to 95 killed and 560 wounded. British forces had 4 killed and 10 wounded in two separate attacks in the outskirts of Fallujah. Iraqi forces suffered 8 killed and 43 wounded. Estimates of insurgent casualties are complicated by a lack of official figures. Most estimates place the number of insurgents killed at around 1,200 to 1,500, with some estimations as high as over 2,000 killed. Coalition forces also captured approximately 1,500 insurgents during the operation. The Red Cross estimated directly following the battle that some 800 civilians had been killed during the offensive. The Iraq Body Count project reported between 581 and 670 civilian deaths resulting from the battle.

The 1st Marine Division fired a total of 5,685 high-explosive 155mm artillery rounds during the battle. The 3rd Marine Air Wing (aviation assets only) expended 318 precision bombs, 391 rockets and missiles, and 93,000 machine gun and cannon rounds.

Fallujah suffered extensive damage to residences, mosques, city services, and businesses. The city, once referred to as the "City of Mosques", had over 200 pre-battle mosques of which 60 or so were destroyed in the fighting. Many of these mosques had been used as arms caches and weapon strongpoints by Islamist forces. Of the roughly 50,000 buildings in Fallujah, between 7,000 and 10,000 were estimated to have been destroyed in the offensive and from half to two-thirds of the remaining buildings had notable damage.

While pre-offensive inhabitant figures are unreliable, the nominal population was assumed to have been 200,000–350,000. One report states that both offensives, Operation Vigilant Resolve and Operation Phantom Fury, created 200,000 internally displaced persons who are still living elsewhere in Iraq. While damage to mosques was heavy, coalition forces reported that 66 out of the city's 133 mosques had been found to be holding significant amounts of insurgent weaponry.

In mid-December, residents were allowed to return after undergoing biometric identification, provided they wore their ID cards all the time. Reconstruction progressed slowly and mainly consisted of clearing rubble from heavily damaged areas and reestablishing basic utilities. Only 10% of the pre-offensive inhabitants had returned as of mid-January, and only 30% as of the end of March 2005.

Nevertheless, the battle proved to be less than the decisive engagement that the U.S. military had hoped for. Some of the nonlocal insurgents, along with Zarqawi, were believed to have fled before the military assault, leaving mostly local militants behind. Subsequent U.S. military operations against insurgent positions were ineffective at drawing out insurgents into another open battle, and by September 2006, the situation had deteriorated to the point that the Al-Anbar province that contained Fallujah was reported to be in total insurgent control by the U.S. Marine Corps, with the exception of only pacified Fallujah, but now with an insurgent-plagued Ramadi.

After the U.S. military operation of November 2004, the number of insurgent attacks gradually increased in and around the city, and although news reports were often few and far between, several reports of IED attacks on Iraqi troops were reported in the press. Most notable of these attacks was a suicide car bomb attack on 23 June 2005 on a convoy that killed 6 Marines. Thirteen other Marines were injured in the attack. However, fourteen months later insurgents were again able to operate in large numbers.

A third push was mounted from September 2006 and lasted until mid-January 2007. Tactics developed in what has been called the "Third Battle of Fallujah," when applied on a larger scale in Ramadi and the surrounding area, led to what became known as "the Great Sunni Awakening." After four years of bitter fighting, Fallujah was turned over to the Iraqi Forces and the Iraqi Provincial Authority during the autumn of 2007.

Al Qaeda-linked Sunni insurgents from the Islamic State in Iraq and the Levant subsequently took over Fallujah and parts of Ramadi in early 2014 and the city was reclaimed by the Iraqi Army and Special Operations Units in June 2016.

Order of battle

American forces
http://www.s-a-m-s.org/patriot/features/FirstQtr2005/letter.htm 
http://www.defendamerica.mil/articles/nov2004/a111004a.html 
West, Bing. "No True Glory", Bantam Books. 2005. Page. 329

Regimental Combat Team 1 (RCT-1) built around the 1st Marine Regiment:
 3rd Battalion 1st Marines (Infantry)
 3rd Battalion 5th Marines (Infantry)
 2nd Battalion, 7th Cavalry (1st Cavlary Division)
 2nd Tank Battalion, Co. C
 1st Force Reconnaissance Company
 2nd Reconnaissance Battalion
 3rd Light Armored Reconnaissance Battalion (Mechanized) (Armored)
 1st Platoon, Company C, 3–153rd Infantry, 39th Brigade Combat Team
 Companies C and D, 2nd Assault Amphibian Battalion (Armored)
 1st, 2nd and 3rd Platoon, Company A, 3rd Assault Amphibian Battalion Armored
 1st Battalion 9th Infantry Regiment Manchu Mechanized, 1st and 2nd Platoon, C.Co, 2nd Brigade Combat Team, 2nd Infantry Division(U.S. Army)
 Military Police/EOD Platoon [MWSS 373]
 Combat Service Support Company 113, Combat Service Support Battalion 1
 Combat Service Support Company 122, Heavy Equipment/Ordnance Platoon, 1st Maintenance Battalion
 Counter Battery Radar Platoon, 14th Marine Regiment (Artillery)
 4th Battalion 14th Marines— Mike Battery Palehorse (Provisional Infantry, Scout and Targeting Forward Observation Sections, and Primary Direct Support Artillery)
 Company C, 3rd Battalion, 8th Cavalry Regiment, (U.S. Army)
 2nd Platoon, Company B, 2nd Battalion, 162nd Infantry (U.S. Army)
 2D Platoon, Alpha Company, 876 Combat Engineer Battalion
 3rd Platoon, Company E, 3rd Assault Amphibian Battalion Armored 
 TOW Platoon (-), 23rd Marines
 Scout Platoon, Headquarters & Service Company, 4th Tank Battalion
 Scout Platoon, 2nd Tank Battalion (Attached to HQ Btry. 2nd Battalion, 10th Marines Battalion 10th Marines)
 Company A, MP Battalion, 2nd Marine Logistics Group, 2nd Marine Division
 Company B, (reinforced), 2nd Combat Engineer Battalion, 2nd Marine Division
 Military Police Company A, 4th Marine Logistics Group, 4th Marine Division
 Detachment 4, 4th Civil Affairs Group
 Combat Logistics Company 115, Combat Logistics Battalion 1, 1st Marine Logistics Group
 Bravo Surgical Company, 1st Medical Battalion, 1st Force Service Support Group
 Shock Trauma Platoon, 1st Marine Logistics Group
 Company B, 1st Battalion, 4th Marines
 Company B, 1st Battalion, 23rd Marines
 Evac Platoon, Company C, 181 SPT Battalion, 81 HBCT
 2nd Battalion 11th Marines, Kilo 3/12, Golf, HQ Btry (Artillery- Serving as Provisionary Rifle Companies)
 Charlie Btry. 1st Battalion 10th Marines (Artillery- Serving as Provisional Infantry Company, attached to 2nd Battalion, 10th Marines, w/direct support by 2 teams from STA Platoon, HQ Btry. 2nd Battalion 10th Marines)
 Lima Battery, 3rd Battalion, 10th Marines Battalion, 10th Marines (Artillery- Serving as Provisional Infantry Company, attached to 2nd Battalion, 10th Marines w/direct support from 2 teams of STA Platoon, HQ Btry. 2/10)
 4th Battalion 14th Marines, Kilo Btry (Artillery- Serving as Provisional Infantry Company, Attached to 2nd Battalion, 10th Marines, 2 Mar Div.)
 Motor Transport Platoon (HQ Btry. 2nd Battalion 10th Marines)
 Task Force ECHO (NMCB (Naval Mobile Construction Battalion) FOUR, NMCB TWO THREE, and Company A, 120th Engineer Battalion Oklahoma National Guard)
 Marine Aircraft Group 39 – HMLA-367, HMLA-169 DET A, HMM-161, HMM-364 and HMM-268 at Al Taqaddum Airbase
 VMFA(AW)-242, VMA-542, HMM-365 at Al Asad Air Base
 3rd Squad, 3rd Platoon, A Co, 44th Engineer Battalion, 2nd Brigade, 2nd Inf Div
 3rd Platoon, A Co, 2/72 Tank Battalion, 2nd Infantry Division (U.S. Army)
 B Company, 9th Psychological Operations Battalion, Airborne (U.S. Army)
 H&S and C Cos. 4th Combat Engineer Battalion
 Naval Mobile Construction Battalion 4 (Seabees)
 Naval Mobile Construction Battalion 23 (Seabees)
 Naval Mobile Construction Battalion 133 (Seabees)

Regimental Combat Team 7 (RCT-7) built around the 7th Marine Regiment:
 1st Battalion 3rd Marines (Infantry)
 1st Battalion 8th Marines (Infantry)
 2nd Battalion, 2nd Infantry Regiment, 1st Infantry Division
 2nd Tank Battalion, Co. A 
 2nd Reconnaissance Battalion 
 2nd Force Reconnaissance Company
 1st Light Armored Reconnaissance Battalion, Co. C
 2nd Light Armored Reconnaissance Battalion, Co. A
 Tactical PSYOP Team 1171 (USAR), 1/3 Marines (attached)
2nd Platoon, Alpha Company, 82nd Engineer Battalion
 F Troop, 4th Cavalry (Brigade Reconnaissance Troop)
Alpha Company, 2nd Battalion, 63rd Armor Regiment
 Bravo Company 1st Battalion, 63rd Armored Regiment
 1st Platoon, Charlie Company, 82nd Engineer Battalion
1st Platoon, Alpha Battery, 1st Battalion, 6th Field Artillery Regiment (M109A6, 155mm SP)
 1st Battalion 12th Marines – Battery "C" (Artillery)
 F Troop, 4th Cavalry, 3rd Brigade Reconnaissance Troop, 1st Infantry Division (U.S. Army)
 Company C, 2nd Combat Engineer Battalion
 2nd Platoon, C Company, 44th Engineer Battalion, 2nd Brigade, 2nd Infantry Division (U.S. Army)
 Company C, 2nd Assault Amphibian Battalion (Armored)
 Company B, MP Battalion, 4th Marine Logistics Group
 3rd Platoon, Combat Engineer Company, Combat Assault Battalion, 3rd Marine Division
 2nd Platoon, Company C, 3rd Assault Amphibian Battalion
 1st Platoon, Engineer Company C, 6th Engineer Support Battalion
 MEU Service Support Group 31, 31st Marine Expeditionary Unit
 Explosive Ordnance Disposal Mobile Unit THREE
 B Company, 445th Civil Affairs Battalion (U.S. Army)
 A Troop 2nd Squadron, 14th Cavalry (U.S. Army)
 Alpha Company, 458th Engineer Battalion, Engineer Brigade, 1st Cavalry Division (U.S. Army)
 759th Military Police Battalion Composite (U.S. Army)
 HHD, 759th Military Police Battalion (FWD)
 148th Military Police Team (FWD) (Police Intelligence)
 21st Military Police Company (Airborne) (Combat Support)
 630th Military Police Company (Combat Support)
 984th Military Police Company (Combat Support)
 15th Forward Support Battalion
 2nd Brigade, 1st Cavalry Division TAC (Bravo Company, 13th Signal, E-31; Bravo Company, 312th Military Intel)
 689th Engineer Company (Clearance) (U.S. Army Reserve)
1st Squadron, 124th Cavalry
CROWS Team One
 Small Craft Company Special Operations River Recon

Ninth Air Force (United States Air Forces Central Command) (U.S. Air Force)
 24th Special Tactics Squadron
 187th Fighter Wing (Alabama Air National Guard) (F-16 Fighting Falcon)
 379th Air Expeditionary Wing (F-15 Strike Eagle, F-16 Fighting Falcon, A-10 Thunderbolt II, AC-130 Gunship)
 2d Bomb Wing (B-52 Stratofortress)
 9th Reconnaissance Wing (U-2 Dragon Lady)
 116th Air Control Wing (E-8 Joint STARS)
 432d Air Expeditionary Wing (MQ-1 Predator drones, operated remotely from Creech Air Force Base, Nevada)

U.S. Special Operations Command
 Naval Special Warfare Task Group-Central (Sniper Elements Alpha, Bravo, and Charlie from SEAL Teams 3, 5, 8, and SDVT-1)
 1st Special Forces Operational Detachment-Delta
 Det One
 5th Special Forces Group

Iraqi forces
 1st Specialized Special Forces Battalion (Iraqi National Guard), Companies D and B
 Iraqi 36th Commando Battalion
 Iraqi Counterterrorism Force
 Emergency Response Unit (Iraqi-Ministry of Interior) – Attached to RCT-7
 1st Battalion, 1st Brigade, Iraqi Intervention Force (ICDC) – Operated independently of Coalition forces
 2nd Battalion, 1st Brigade, Iraqi Intervention Force (IIF) – Attached to RCT-7
 4th Battalion, 1st Brigade, Iraqi Intervention Force (IIF) – Attached to RCT-1
 5th Battalion, 3rd Brigade, Iraqi Intervention Force (IIF) – Attached to RCT-7
 6th Battalion, 3rd Brigade, Iraqi Intervention Force (IIF) – Attached to 2nd Brigade, 1st Cavalry Division

British forces
 1st Battalion, The Black Watch

Controversies
There were numerous controversies relating to the United States' tactics during the battle, including the weapons used, civilian casualties, and collateral damage.

The use of white phosphorus during the battle was first reported on November 10, 2004, by Washington Post reporters, embedded with U.S marines, who witnessed artillery guns firing white phosphorus projectiles which "create a screen of fire that cannot be extinguished with water." Insurgents also reported being attacked with a substance that melted their skin, and the corpses of some dead insurgents were burned or melted.  

A documentary released in November 2005, entitled Fallujah, The Hidden Massacre, stated that Iraqi militants and civilians, including women and children, had died of burns caused by white phosphorus munitions. The documentary alleged that white phosphorus was used in "massive and indiscriminate way", and included graphic video and photos of burned bodies with faces melted away and clothing still mostly intact. The U.S. military maintains that white phosphorus was not used against civilians, but has confirmed its use as an incendiary weapon against enemy combatants. A 2005 article by a US Army captain present at the battle published in the US Army's Field Artillery Manual notes that white phosphorus was used against insurgents in situations where conventional munitions did not have the desired effects. According to the Organization for the Prohibition of Chemical Weapons (OPCW), white phosphorus is not recognized as a chemical weapon and the Chemical Weapons Convention does not govern its use. The OPCW also stated that white phosphorus is permitted for use as an illumination device and as a weapon with regard to heat energy, but not permitted as an offensive weapon with regard to its chemical properties.

On 16 November 2004, NBC News aired footage that showed a U.S. Marine killing a wounded Iraqi fighter. In this video, the Marine was heard saying that the Iraqi was "playing possum". NCIS investigators later determined that the Marine was acting in self-defense. 

Agence France-Presse (AFP) and other news agencies reported that military-age males, 15 to 50 years old, were prevented from leaving the city before the battle began by the U.S. military. All entrances to the city were controlled by U.S. forces.

Mike Marqusee, in a November 2005 article for The Guardian, compared the battle to the Mỹ Lai massacre, the bombing of Guernica, and the Halabja chemical attack and wrote "The US claims that 2,000 died, most of them fighters. Other sources disagree. When medical teams arrived in January they collected more than 700 bodies in only one third of the city. Iraqi NGOs and medical workers estimate between 4,000 and 6,000 dead, mostly civilians."

US forces used depleted uranium (DU) shells during the battle. DU shells are derived from radioactive uranium ore and disperse DU dust into the environment during impact. In the years after the battle, medical research teams have reported increases in infant mortality, cancer, and congenital anomalies or birth defects among children born in Fallujah. According to a 2011 study by Alaani et al., depleted uranium exposure from munitions used during the war was either a primary cause or related to the cause of the birth defect and cancer increases. According to a 2012 journal article by Al-Hadithi et al., existing studies and research evidence does not show a "clear increase in birth defects" or a "clear indication of a possible environmental exposure including depleted uranium". The article further states that "there is actually no substantial evidence that genetic defects can arise from parental exposure to DU in any circumstances."

In popular culture

Documentaries
 Occupation: Dreamland, a 2005 documentary film that follows soldiers of the 1/505 of the 82nd Airborne Division in Fallujah, Iraq, in the beginning of 2004.
 Shootout! – Episode 1: D-Day: Fallujah (UPC: 733961741353), a 2006 A&E History Channel Special detailing various gun battles that occurred during the Second Battle of Fallujah.
 The Road to Fallujah, a 2009 documentary following the story of Mark Manning, the only westerner to live among the residents of Fallujah following the November 2004 battle.
 Fear Not the Path of Truth, a 2013 documentary film from Ross Caputi, a veteran of the 2nd siege of Fallujah who investigates atrocities that occurred and the legacy of US foreign policy in Fallujah.
 Fallujah, The Hidden Massacre, a documentary investigating the use of white phosphorus and the MK-77 by the U.S. Army during the battle.
Once Upon a Time in Iraq, a 2020 BBC documentary series, featured the Battle of Fallujah in its third episode.

Films 
 Pasaje al amanecer, a 2017 war drama which is based on the Christmas Eve before the war.

Games
 Six Days in Fallujah, is a video game that follows a squad of U.S. Marines from 3rd Battalion, 1st Marines over the span of the six bloodiest days in the battle for Fallujah. It was dropped by Konami for the controversy surrounding it and remained in limbo until 2021. The restarted game was announced in 2021 with publishing of Victura and developed by Highwire Games.
 Close Combat: First to Fight, is a video game that was also designed with input from former and active-duty U.S. Marines from 3rd Battalion, 1st Marines, who had participated in combat around Fallujah, Iraq during Operation Phantom Fury.
 Phantom Fury: The 2nd Battle for Fallujah, is a solitaire board game based on the actions of 3rd Battalion, 1st Marine Regiment, 1st Marine Division in the Jolan district in November 2004.

Music
 "In Old Yellowcake", song by Rasputina (2007)
 "Christmas in Fallujah", song by Jefferson Pepper (2005) (UPC: 669910486467)
 "Christmas in Fallujah", song by Cass Dillon and Billy Joel (2007) (Digital download, CD single)
 Fallujah, an opera with music by the Canadian composer Tobin Stokes and libretto by Heather Raffo.
 "Fallujah" by Serbian roots reggae band FC Apartride Utd, On The Frontline Menu 2006, LP
 "Strike, O lions of Fallujah!" - An Iraqi song
 Fallujah is an American technical death metal band from San Francisco, California, formed in 2007.

Books 
No True Glory: A Frontline Account of the Battle for Fallujah
My Men are My Heroes: The Brad Kasal Story
We Were One: Shoulder to Shoulder with the Marines Who Took Fallujah
New Dawn: The Battles for Fallujah
Operation Phantom Fury: The Assault and Capture of Fallujah, Iraq
Sunrise Over Fallujah
Fallujah Memoirs: A Grunt's Eye View of the Second Battle of Fallujah
Ghosts of Fallujah
U.S. Marines in Battle: Fallujah, November–December 2004
House to House: An Epic Memoir of War
Code Red Fallujah: A Doctor's Memoir at War
Fallujah, with Honor; First Battalion, Eighth Marine's Role in Operation Phantom Fury; Expanded 2nd Edition
All Of Which I Saw

See also

 2003 invasion of Iraq
 2004 in Iraq
 Battle of Mosul (2004)
 Operation Alljah

References

Bibliography

Further reading
 No True Glory: A Frontline Account of the Battle for Fallujah, by Bing West (2005)
 We Were One: Shoulder to Shoulder with the Marines Who Took Fallujah, by Patrick O'Donnell (2006)
 Fighting For Fallujah: A New Dawn for Iraq, by John R. Ballard (2006)
 Fallujah With Honor: First Battalion, Eighth Marine's Role in Operation Phantom Fury, by Gary Livingston (2006)
 Battle for Fallujah (book)|Battle of Fallujah: Occupation, Resistance And Stalemate in the War in Iraq, by Vincent L. Foulk (2006)
 Among Warriors in Iraq: True Grit, Special Ops, and Raiding in Mosul and Fallujah, by Mike Tucker (2006)
 Iraq 1941: The Battles For Basra, Habbaniya, Fallujah and Baghdad, by Robert Lyman (2006)
 My Men Are My Heroes: The Brad Kasal Story, by Brad Kasal as told to Nathaniel R. Helms (2007)
 On Call in Hell: A Doctor's Iraq War Story, by Cdr. Richard Jadick (2007)
 House to House: An Epic Memoir of War, by SSG David Bellavia (2007)
 The Navy Cross (book)|The Navy Cross: Extraordinary Heroism in Iraq, Afghanistan and Other Conflicts, by James E. Wise, Scott Baron (2007)
 Marakat Al-Fallujah: Hazimat Amrika Fi Al-Iraq, by Ahmad Mansur (2008)
 Sunrise over Fallujah (2008)
 Fallujah: Shock & Awe (2009)
 Inside Fallujah: The Unembedded Story, Ahmed Mansour (2009)
 The Daily Thoughts of a Fallujah Marine by Josh Daugherty (2009)
 
 Operation Phantom Fury: The Assault and Capture of Fallujah, Iraq, by Dick Camp (2009)
 New Dawn: The Battles for Fallujah, by Richard S. Lowry (2010) plus Presentation at the Pritzker Military Library on 3 November 2011

External links
 Shootout: Fallujah – History Channel documentary about the Battle of Fallujah
 Eyewitness Fallujah: A British TV Cameraman's account of Operation Phantom Fury
 "The Legality of the Use of White Phosphorus by the United States Military during the 2004 Fallujah Assaults" (24 January 2007). Berkeley Electronic Press Preprint Series. Working Paper 1959.
 3/1 Update from Fallujah, 29 Dec. 2004., Marine Corps Moms

Conflicts in 2004
2004 in Iraq
Battles of the Iraq War in 2004
Battles of the Iraq War involving Iraq
Battles of the Iraq War involving the United States
Fallujah
Operations involving American special forces
United States Marine Corps in the Iraq War
Urban warfare
Articles containing video clips
November 2004 events in Iraq
December 2004 events in Iraq